George Makepeace House, also known as the Makepeace-Cornelius-McCallister House, is a historic home located at Chesterfield, Madison County, Indiana.  It was built in 1850, and is a -story, five bay, rectangular, Federal style brick commercial / residential building.  It has a side gable roof and two paired brick chimneys at each end.

It was listed in the National Register of Historic Places in 1985.

References

Houses on the National Register of Historic Places in Indiana
Federal architecture in Indiana
Houses completed in 1850
Buildings and structures in Madison County, Indiana
National Register of Historic Places in Madison County, Indiana